The Collegiate Church of St Peter and St Paul is a medieval collegiate church and a National Monument in Kilmallock, Ireland. The church is believed to have been built on the site of an ancient monastery.

Location
The church is located on the south bank of the River Loobagh, to the north of Kilmallock's main street.

History
The church was completed by 1241, on what was probably the site of an earlier monastery, founded by Mocheallóg c. AD 600. A round tower has its foundations here.  It was dedicated to Peter and Paul in 1410.

The nave and transept were substantially altered in 1420 by Maurice Fitzgerald.  It became a collegiate church c. 1500.

Carved tombs from the 16th century are visible in the south transept.

The building was partly destroyed by Cromwell and was roofless since 1657 according to Samuel Lewis.

The church remained in use by the local Church of Ireland until a 1935 fire.

Church
In the northwest corner of the nave is a tower which incorporates the stump of a round tower from the early monastery. The church which is dedicated to Saints Peter and Paul consisted of a nave and chancel with a south transept.

It has three aisles, a chancel and a north transept. There is a fine 13th century doorway in the south wall. The chancel has five lancet windows.

References

Religion in County Limerick
Archaeological sites in County Limerick
National Monuments in County Limerick
Former churches in the Republic of Ireland
Former collegiate churches
Collegiate churches in Ireland